Loretta Jafelice is a Canadian voice actress. She voiced Eugeal, Diana, and many supporting and monster characters in both the DIC Entertainment and Cloverway Inc. versions of the Japanese anime Sailor Moon. She also played Susan in Season 2 of Monster by Mistake, Maxie in Maxie's World, Valerie in Max & Ruby and the Despair Spirit in Mythic Warriors: Guardians of the Legend which are voice roles in western animation.

Sources
 
 http://www.tv.com/loretta-jafelice/person/194865/summary.html

Canadian video game actresses
Canadian voice actresses
Living people
20th-century Canadian actresses
21st-century Canadian actresses
1961 births